Victor Ninov (born 27 June 1959) is a Bulgarian physicist and former researcher who worked primarily in creating superheavy elements.  He is known for the co-discoveries of elements 110, 111, and 112 (darmstadtium, roentgenium and copernicium).

Ninov also claimed the creation of elements 116 and 118; however, an investigation concluded that he had falsified the evidence. The repercussions of the affair had an impact on the guidelines of conduct for several research institutions.

Early life 
Victor Ninov was born in Bulgaria on 27 June 1959. He grew up in the capital city of Sofia. In the 1970s, when Ninov was a teenager, he and his family left for West Germany; they bounced around from house to house. Shortly after the move, Victor's father went missing; he was found dead six months later in the Bulgarian foothills due to causes unknown.

Career 

Victor Ninov attended Technische Universität Darmstadt near Frankfurt, Germany. Here, he distinguished himself as a very capable physicist: he was particularly good at building scientific instruments and coding analysis programs for them.

This landed him a job at the nearby German research center GSI (Helmholtzzentrum für Schwerionenforschung), where he worked on his doctorate and postdoctoral work of creating new elements.

For his expertise, he was given sole control of the computer analysis program. Here, he became a rising star by co-discovering darmstadtium (element 110), roentgenium (element 111), and copernicium (element 112) by smashing ion beams into heavy elements using GSI's UNILAC (a type of particle accelerator) and analyzing the debris. Though an investigation later determined that these discoveries of element 110 and 112 included fabricated samples created by Ninov, additional evidence of the experiment was confirmed to be untampered with, rendering his co-discovery legitimate. These discoveries were made with the help of his addition of a gas separator to the particle accelerator to help filter out everything but the heavy elements they were looking for.

He worked at Stanford University for a time. He was hired at Lawrence Berkeley National Laboratory (LBNL) in 1996 as a world class expert for particle accelerator debris sensors, and analysis programs.

Fraud investigation 

While working at Lawrence Berkeley National Laboratory (LBNL) Victor Ninov and his team pursued a hypothesis by Robert Smolańczuk that element 118 could be formed at relatively low energies by smashing 86Kr and 208Pb isotopes together. Ninov initially doubted the hypothesis he was pursuing; he is quoted as saying, "We didn't know how many orders of magnitude he [Smolańczuk] was wrong".

Ninov, again, held sole control of the data analysis program called GOOSY, and he was the only one on the team that knew how to use it. In 1999, Ninov and his team reported sightings of element 118, almost exactly as predicted, and a decay chain that also produced element 116. However, other laboratories were unable to reproduce the results.

Eager to prove their discovery, the team double-checked their instruments, and tried again. One more sighting was made by Ninov, but it was dismissed by a colleague, and a full formal investigation was spawned to get to the bottom of elements 118 and 116. The original element 118 data was independently analysed, and in the original binary data, there was no indication of the presence of element 118 or 116. The investigation dragged on for a year, until it was concluded that "Ninov... intentionally misled his colleagues-and everyone else-by fabricating data".

Ninov, who had been placed on leave, was fired. The rest of Ninov's team officially retracted their claims in 2002. There was also an investigation conducted into Ninov's unsupervised science at GSI; it was found that "two sightings were spuriously created" (one of element 110 and another of element 112). However, very perplexingly, these false flags were found amongst lots of real data that still supported that his co-discoveries were legitimate. It was the conclusion of the GSI investigation that the discovery of those elements was legitimate.  At minimum it is certain that Victor Ninov made a "wrongful claim" about elements 116 and 118.

The heavy elements 116 and 118 were eventually discovered and verified in the Joint Institute for Nuclear Research in Dubna, Russia, and were observed contrary to LBNL's observations. These elements were named livermorium and oganesson respectively. Ninov maintains that he was innocent to this day.

Impact on the scientific community
The reports of the investigation came as quite a shock to other scientists as Ninov had been previously regarded as a very respected physicist. In the aftermath of the investigation it was troubling to many that so many co-authors on the papers about LBNL were none the wiser to learn they had contributed to a false statement. The Ninov affair resulted in stricter guidelines being set for coauthors; these rules "clarify co-authors' roles and duties" and they are "requiring all coauthors to vouch for their contribution to published work".

The American Physical Society has also called for increased ethical training and oversight at research institutions, and has sponsored several speakers in an effort to make the scientific community more comfortable and resilient to scientific fraud. Reports on the Ninov affair were released around the same time as the final report on the Schön affair, another major incident of data falsification in physics, and this amplified its impact.

Current life 
Ninov is retired from physics. He lives in California. His wife, Caroline Cox, a former history professor at University of the Pacific, died in 2014 of cancer. They were married for 29 years. Ninov helped finish her book, Boy Soldiers of the American Revolution, and it was published postmortem. He is an avid sailor, and pilots a four-seat plane.

See also
 List of experimental errors and frauds in physics
 List of scientific misconduct incidents

References

External links
 Observation of Superheavy Nuclei Produced in the Reaction of 86Kr with 208Pb – Communication in "Physical Review Letters" stating observation of the element 118 published by Victor Ninov's research group
 Sanacacio.net Copy of NY Times article on the Ninov controversy
 Atomic Lies An essay about V. Ninov's career

Living people
1959 births
Academic scandals
American nuclear physicists
American people of Bulgarian descent
Bulgarian nuclear physicists
People involved in scientific misconduct incidents
University of California, Berkeley staff
Technische Universität Darmstadt alumni
Oganesson
Livermorium